Kairady  is a village in the Palakkad district, state of Kerala, India. It forms a part of the Ayiloor gram panchayat.

Demographics
 India census, Kairady had a population of 8695 with 4248 males and 4447 females.

References

Kairady